Algonac is a city in St. Clair County of the U.S. state of Michigan. The population was 4,196 at the 2020 census.

Algonac is located at the southern end of the St. Clair River, just before it splits into a large delta region known as the St. Clair Flats. (Coordinates ) The St. Clair River drains Lake Huron into Lake St. Clair and is part of the Great Lakes Waterway.

At the center of Algonac is Algonac City Park, a park which contains a half-mile long boardwalk along the St. Clair River. Just to the north of the city is Algonac State Park.

Algonac was the birthplace of Emily Helen Butterfield, an artist and the first woman to be licensed as an architect in Michigan. She was famous for innovations in church architecture. It was the home of the now-defunct Chris-Craft boat company, the maker of the first mass-produced speedboats. It was also the home of Gar Wood, the first great speed boat racer.

Algonac is home to two museums dedicated to its history. The Algonac Clay Community Museum contains many displays of Algonac's local history. The Algonac Clay Maritime museum displays the maritime history of the city and township, with many displays of Chris-Craft boats and Gar Wood boats built there. Both museums are open every weekend from May through October. Algonac is known as the birthplace of modern power boating.

History

Long occupied by Native American tribes, Algonac was settled in 1805 by European American John Martin, in the newly-organized Michigan Territory. The area had been known by French colonists, the first Europeans to settle here, as Pointe Du Chêne ("oak point", because of local trees). The later British colonists called it Manchester. In 1836, it was the fourth village laid out by Americans along the St. Clair River. Its present name was coined by Henry Schoolcraft and applied to the area in 1843.

Most settlement did not occur until the mid-19th century and later. In 1863, the small community was described as containing "a church, two or three saw-mills, a grist-mill, woollen factory, and about 700 inhabitants". It served as the center of a farming area. The economy was also based in lumbering, shipping, and trades associated with maritime activities on the Great Lakes.

Geography

Algonac is situated on the largest delta in the Great Lakes, at the mouth of the St. Clair River. As the city has many canals, it has been nicknamed "the Venice of Michigan". The city is located in the Blue Water Area, a sub-region of the Thumb.

Demographics

2010 census
As of the census of 2010, there were 4,110 people, 1,756 households, and 1,082 families living in the city. The racial makeup of the city was 97.1% White, 0.3% African American, 0.7% Native American, 0.1% Asian, 0.1% from other races, and 1.6% from two or more races. Hispanic or Latino of any race were 1.3% of the population.

There were 1,756 households, of which 28.2% had children under the age of 18 living with them, 44.8% were married couples living together, 11.8% had a female householder with no husband present, 5.0% had a male householder with no wife present, and 38.4% were non-families. 31.7% of all households were made up of individuals, and 14.1% had someone living alone who was 65 years of age or older. The average household size was 2.33 and the average family size was 2.92.

The median age in the city was 42.3 years. 21.2% of residents were under the age of 18; 8.6% were between the ages of 18 and 24; 24% were from 25 to 44; 30.8% were from 45 to 64; and 15.5% were 65 years of age or older. The gender makeup of the city was 49.6% male and 50.4% female.

2000 census
As of the census of 2000, there were 4,613 people, 1,871 households, and 1,212 families living in the city. The racial makeup of the city was 97.36% White, 0.15% African American, 0.95% Native American, 0.20% Asian, 0.02% Pacific Islander, 0.17% from other races, and 1.15% from two or more races. Hispanic or Latino of any race were 1.02% of the population.

There were 1,871 households, out of which 31.0% had children under the age of 18 living with them, 49.5% were married couples living together, 10.7% had a female householder with no husband present, and 35.2% were non-families. 30.3% of all households were made up of individuals, and 15.2% had someone living alone who was 65 years of age or older.  The average household size was 2.46 and the average family size was 3.05.

In the city, the population was spread out, with 25.5% under the age of 18, 7.5% from 18 to 24, 30.2% from 25 to 44, 23.2% from 45 to 64, and 13.5% who were 65 years of age or older.  The median age was 37 years. For every 100 females, there were 93.3 males.  For every 100 females age 18 and over, there were 91.8 males.

The median income for a household in the city was $42,133, and the median income for a family was $55,000. Males had a median income of $41,644 versus $25,000 for females. The per capita income for the city was $22,441.  About 8.6% of families and 9.4% of the population were below the poverty line, including 10.7% of those under age 18 and 15.2% of those age 65 or over.

Transportation

Major highways
  M-29 runs through the city as Pointe Tremble Road and St. Clair River Drive, parallel to the St. Clair River
  M-154 runs entirely on Harsens Island, roughly southwest to northeast

Ferry
The Walpole–Algonac Ferry crosses the St. Clair River along the Canada–United States border, connecting Algonac with the Walpole Island First Nation in Ontario.

Near Algonac's city center, ferry service is available to Russell Island. Just to the west of the city, in Clay Township, ferry service is also offered to Harsens Island.

Bus
The Blue Water Area Transportation Commission operates a Port Huron-to-Chesterfield Township bus service morning and evening Monday-Friday that passes through Algonac via M-29.  This connects with the SMART system of Metro Detroit.

See also

 Danny DeKeyser - Defenseman of the Detroit Red Wings in the National Hockey League
 Jeff Gutt - lead singer of Stone Temple Pilots; grew up and attended school in Algonac
 Garfield Wood - racing legend; one-time resident of Algonac
 Chris-Craft - boating manufacturer, which started in Algonac in 1922
 Killshot - this 1989 novel by Elmore Leonard is partially set in Algonac
 Tashmoo Park

References

External links

 Official City Website
 Algonac State Park - Michigan DNR website
 Algonac High School - local public high school

Cities in St. Clair County, Michigan
Michigan populated places on Lake St. Clair
Michigan populated places on the St. Clair River
Populated places established in 1805
1805 establishments in Michigan Territory